Spokesperson bishops in the Church of England are bishops in the church who, additionally to their see, have an episcopal role relating to a particular sector, situation or group of people.

Bishops to His Majesty's Prisons
The Bishop to His Majesty's Prisons is an episcopal post relating to the church's chaplaincy to His Majesty's Prison Service.

The post has been held, alongside a diocesan or suffragan see, by at least five bishops:
1975–1985: John Cavell, Bishop of Southampton
1985: Br Michael (Fisher), Bishop of St Germans
1985–2001: Robert Hardy, Bishop of Maidstone until 1987, thereafter of Lincoln
2001–2007: Peter Selby, Bishop of Worcester
2007–2013: James Jones, Bishop of Liverpool
2013–2020: James Langstaff, Bishop of Rochester
2020–present: Rachel Treweek, Bishop of Gloucester

Bishops for Urban Life and Faith
The Bishop for Urban Life and Faith is an episcopal post relating to the church's outreach into urban communities.

The post has been held, alongside a diocesan or suffragan see, by two bishops since its 2006 creation:
2006–2009: Stephen Lowe, Bishop of Hulme
2009–present: Christopher Chessun, Bishop of Woolwich then of Southwark

Lead bishop on healthcare issues
On 20 October 2010, it was announced that James Newcome, Bishop of Carlisle had been appointed lead bishop on healthcare issues.

Lead bishop for religious communities
David Walker, Bishop of Dudley then of Manchester has been Chair of the Advisory Council on the Relations of Bishops and Religious Communities since before November 2012; as such he is described as lead bishop for religious communities.

Chairs of the CMDDP
On 19 April 2013, it was announced that Nick Holtam, Bishop of Salisbury had been appointed Chair of the Committee for Ministry of and among Deaf and Disabled People (CMDDP).
By 2020, Richard Atkinson, Bishop of Bedford, had taken over as Chair.

Bishops for Higher and Further Education
2013–2021: Tim Dakin, Bishop of Winchester
2021–present: Christopher Cocksworth, Bishop of Coventry

References

 
Anglican episcopal offices
Anglicanism
Church of England